"A Cry in the Night" is a single by Lory "Bonnie" Bianco. It was released in 1989, and was a rather successful hit in Europe, which peaked at #1 on Austrian Singles Charts and at #41 in Germany.

Track listing & formats 
Original versions

Radio Version - 3:20
Extended Version - 4:45
Instrumental Version - 3:45

1989 singles
Songs written by Dieter Bohlen
1989 songs